Federico Paulucci (born 11 January 1990) is an Argentine footballer.

He has played for Udinese or U. de Concepción.

References
 Profile at BDFA 
 

1990 births
Living people
Argentine footballers
Argentine expatriate footballers
Universidad de Concepción footballers
San Luis de Quillota footballers
Santiago Morning footballers
Expatriate footballers in Chile
Expatriate footballers in Italy
Chilean Primera División players
Primera B de Chile players
People from General López Department
Association football defenders
Sportspeople from Santa Fe Province